Antoine van der Linden (born 17 March 1976) is a Dutch former footballer who played as a central defender.

He amassed Eredivisie totals of 240 games and eight goals over the course of ten seasons, representing in the competition Sparta Rotterdam, Groningen and Heracles.

Football career
Born in Rotterdam, van der Linden started his career in 1997 with local Sparta Rotterdam, appearing in an average of 12 Eredivisie games during three seasons. In the 2000 summer he joined Swindon Town in England, featuring regularly for the Football League One club.

After only one year, van der Linden returned to his country, signing with FC Emmen of the second division. In 2003, he returned to the top level, playing four solid years with FC Groningen and helping the side to the fifth position in the 2005–06 campaign, with the subsequent qualification to the UEFA Cup.

In 2007, van der Linden moved to Portugal with C.S. Marítimo: never an undisputed starter with the Madeirans, he did manage to appear regularly, but also experienced a brief spell with the reserves in his second and last year.

In July 2009, 33-year-old van der Linden signed a one-year deal with Heracles Almelo as a replacement for Jan Wuytens who moved to FC Utrecht. He helped the team to the sixth place in the top flight, contributing with one goal in a 4–1 home win over bottom-placed RKC Waalwijk.

References

External links
 http://www.swindon-town-fc.co.uk/Person.asp?PersonID=VANDERLA
 https://www.gazetteandherald.co.uk/news/7399018.supporters-can-be-our-extra-man/
 https://www.gazetteandherald.co.uk/news/7381213.antoine-out/
 https://www.gazetteandherald.co.uk/news/7385776.we-must-do-it/
 https://www.gazetteandherald.co.uk/news/7382457.antoines-emergency-powers/
 https://www.gazetteandherald.co.uk/news/7390229.dutch-star-happy-with-a-new-role/
 https://www.gazetteandherald.co.uk/news/7386129.dont-panic/
 https://www.gazetteandherald.co.uk/news/7382943.man-of-the-match-antoine-van-der-linden/
 https://www.gazetteandherald.co.uk/news/7389894.any-role-will-do-for-the-dutchman/
 https://www.gazetteandherald.co.uk/news/7383497.antoine-so-gutted-at-his-late-miss/
 https://www.gazetteandherald.co.uk/news/7387717.we-can-beat-southend-where-is-it/
 https://www.gazetteandherald.co.uk/news/7381466.van-der-leaving/
 https://www.gazetteandherald.co.uk/news/7387872.what-price-antoine/
 https://www.gazetteandherald.co.uk/news/7389839.antoine-was-so-desperate-to-score/
 https://www.gazetteandherald.co.uk/news/7388298.off-the-mark/
Stats at Voetbal International 

1976 births
Living people
Footballers from Rotterdam
Dutch footballers
Association football defenders
Eredivisie players
Eerste Divisie players
Derde Divisie players
Sparta Rotterdam players
FC Emmen players
FC Groningen players
Heracles Almelo players
WKE players
English Football League players
Swindon Town F.C. players
Primeira Liga players
Segunda Divisão players
C.S. Marítimo players
Dutch expatriate footballers
Expatriate footballers in England
Expatriate footballers in Portugal
Dutch expatriate sportspeople in Portugal